Jalan Syed Abdullah Aziz or Malacca Coastal Highway, Federal Route 192, is a coastal highway in Malacca City, Malacca, Malaysia. This coastal highway was built as a bypass of the Malacca City Centre and was built to shorten the travel distance between Bandar Hilir and Kampung Limbongan town area from 10 km (estimated) to 5 km (estimated).

The Kilometre Zero of the Federal Route 192 starts at Bandar Hilir. The highway passing Pulau Melaka junctions, Mahkota junctions, Malacca Coastal Bridge, Taman Kota Laksamana junctions and finally Kampung Limbongan junctions.

History
The construction of the highway was proposed in 1996 and it was part of the Malacca coastal development project such as Mahkota Parade, Taman Melaka Raya, Taman Kota Laksamana and Malacca Island. When the reclamation land for the project was done in the late 1990s. Construction of the highway began in 1998 and was completed in 2001. Phase 2 was built from Taman Kota Laksamana junctions to Kampung Limbongan junctions.

Features

 Malacca Coastal Bridge - A box-girder-shaped bridge which crosses the Malacca River, built as a bypass to shorten the travel distance between Bandar Hilir to Kampung Limbongan town area from 10 km (estimated) to 5 km (Estimated).

At most sections, the Federal Route 192 was built under the JKR R5 road standard, allowing maximum speed limit of up to 90 km/h.

List of junctions

References

Highways in Malaysia
Malaysian Federal Roads
Roads in Malacca